The Ohrid–Debar uprising was an uprising by Bulgarians and Albanians in Western Macedonia, then Kingdom of Serbia, in September 1913. It was organized by the Internal Macedonian Revolutionary Organization (IMRO) and Albania against the Serbian capture of the regions of Ohrid, Debar and Struga after the Balkan Wars (1912–13).

Background

The IMRO had discussions with the Albanian revolutionary committee of Sefedin Pustina at Elbasan, Albania, between 12 and 17 August 1913. It was agreed that an uprising would be started against Serbia. A directive dated 21 August planned for a new fighting against Serbia and Greece in Vardar Macedonia and Greek Macedonia. The IMRO leadership decided for a rebellion in Bitola, Ohrid and Debar, and rallied Petar Chaulev, Pavel Hristov, Milan Matov, Hristo Atanasov, Nestor Georgiev, Anton Shibakov, and others in those regions.

Events
The rebellion started only two months after the end of the Second Balkan War. The insurgency sought to challenge Serb control of the region. The Albanian government organised armed resistance and 6,000 Albanians under the command of Isa Boletini, the Minister of War, crossed the frontier. After an engagement with Serbian forces the Albanian forces took Debar and then marched, together with a Bulgarian band led by Petar Chaulev, Milan Matov and Pavel Hristov expelled the Serbian army and officials, creating a front line 15 km east of Ohrid. However, another band was checked with a loss at Mavrovo. Within a few days they captured the towns of Gostivar, Struga and Ohrid, temporarily expelling the Serbian troops. At Ohrid they set up a local government and held the hills towards Resen for four days. During the conflict, the Hellenic Army assisted Serb troops to quash the uprising. The suppression of the uprising resulted in heavy use of violence by Serb forces. Scholar Edvin Pezo states that depictions of Albanians as 'uncultured' and ‘primitive’ by Serb nationalists of the time were a possible reason for the extensive violence perpetrated upon Albanians during the First Balkan War and subsequent Ohrid–Debar uprising. The defeat of the uprising by Serb forces resulted in tens of thousands of Albanian refugees arriving in Albania from Western Macedonia.

CEIP report
According to the International Commission of the Carnegie Endowment for International Peace report, a Serbian army of 100,000 regulars suppressed the uprising. Thousands were killed, and tens of thousands fled to Bulgaria and Albania. Many Bulgarians were imprisoned or shot, a number of Albanian and Bulgarian villages were burned. The number of ethnic Albanian refugees from Macedonia was 25,000.

Legacy
After the 2001 insurgency in Macedonia, Macedonian and Albanian historians discussed the historical cooperation of the two ethnic groups and their joint struggle against their perceived common enemies, including the Serbian government. The 1913 rebellion was the subject of a 2013 conference.

See also
Tikveš uprising

References

Sources

External links
 

Vardar Macedonia (1912–1918)
20th-century rebellions
Military history of North Macedonia
Bulgarian rebellions
1913 in Bulgaria
1913 in Serbia
Conflicts in 1913
Internal Macedonian Revolutionary Organization
Ohrid
September 1913 events
October 1913 events
Albanian rebellions
Macedonian Question